Mount Odin may refer to:

 Mount Odin, in Qikiqtaaluk, Nunavut, Canada
 Mount Odin (British Columbia), in Canada
 Mount Odin (Graham Land), in Graham Land, Antarctica
 Mount Odin (Victoria Land), in Victoria Land, Antarctica